Bernadette Sanou Dao (born 25 February 1952 in Bamako, French Sudan) is a Burkinabé author and politician. At age 11, her family returned to Upper Volta from Mali. She attended Kolog-Naba college in Ouagadougou and later Ohio University in the United States and the Sorbonne in Paris, France. From 1986 to 1987 she was Burkina Faso's Minister for Culture. She lives in Ouagadougou. She writes poetry, short-stories and children's stories.

References

1952 births
Living people
Burkinabé poets
Burkinabé short story writers
Burkinabé women writers
Burkinabé writers in French
Ohio University alumni
University of Paris alumni
Burkinabé people of Malian descent
Women government ministers of Burkina Faso
Culture ministers of Burkina Faso
People from Bamako
People from Ouagadougou
Burkinabé women short story writers
Burkinabé women poets
20th-century women politicians
20th-century women writers
20th-century writers
21st-century women writers
Burkinabé expatriates in France
Burkinabé expatriates in the United States
21st-century Burkinabé people